Werner Nicolai Ekman (15 May 1893 – 3 October 1968) was a Finnish sport shooter who competed in the 1924 Summer Olympics. In 1924 he won the bronze medal as member of the Finnish team in the team clay pigeons competition. He also participated in the individual trap and finished eleventh.

References

External links
Profile

1893 births
1968 deaths
People from Rantasalmi
People from Mikkeli Province (Grand Duchy of Finland)
Finnish male sport shooters
Olympic shooters of Finland
Shooters at the 1924 Summer Olympics
Olympic bronze medalists for Finland
Trap and double trap shooters
Olympic medalists in shooting
Medalists at the 1924 Summer Olympics
Sportspeople from South Savo